Ganesh Shankar Vidyarthi Puraskar is an annual journalism award given by the President of India. It was first granted in 1989

The award was instituted in the memory of Indian journalist and politician Ganesh Shankar Vidyarthi, who was killed during a riot in Kanpur.

References

Indian journalism awards
Awards established in 1989
1989 establishments in India